Pseudomyrmex leptosus is a species of ant in the genus Pseudomyrmex. It is endemic to certain regions in the United States.

References

External links

Insects of the United States
Endemic fauna of the United States
Insects described in 1985
Pseudomyrmecinae
Hymenoptera of North America
Taxonomy articles created by Polbot